Lishuiqiao Station is a station on Line 5 and Line 13 of the Beijing Subway.

Station layout 
The line 5 station uses 2 ground-level side platforms, and the line 13 station uses 2 elevated side platforms.

Exits 
There are 3 exits, lettered A, B1, and B2. Exits A and B1 are accessible.

Gallery

References

External links
 

Beijing Subway stations in Chaoyang District
Railway stations in China opened in 2003